Kholmishche is a rural locality (a village) in Semizerye Rural Settlement, Kaduysky District, Vologda Oblast, Russia. The population was 6 as of 2002.

Geography 
Kholmishche is located 13 km northwest of Kaduy (the district's administrative centre) by road. Pryamikovo is the nearest rural locality.

References 

Rural localities in Kaduysky District